Karianne Lisonbee is an American politician serving as a member of the Utah House of Representatives from the 14th district. Elected in November 2016, she assumed office on January 1, 2017.

Career 
Prior to her election to the Utah legislature, Lisonbee was serving her second term on the Syracuse City Council.

Lisonbee was elected to House Leadership as Assistant Majority Whip in November 2022.

References

Living people
Women state legislators in Utah
Republican Party members of the Utah House of Representatives
Year of birth missing (living people)
21st-century American politicians
21st-century American women politicians
People from Syracuse, Utah